Magdalena Tjernberg (born June 3, 1970) in Gothenburg, is a Swedish former Paralympic swimmer. Her twin sister, Gabriella Tjernberg, was also a parasailing athlete.

She won four gold and one silver medal in the Summer Paralympics which was held in New York in 1984. In the next Summer Paralympics which was held in Seoul in 1988, she took six gold and two silver medals. 

At the European Championships in Rome in 1985, she took five golds. At the 1986 World Cup in Gothenburg, Tjernberg took nine gold, one silver and two bronze. She was named Sports Woman of the Year in 1986.

In 1988, she finished second in the voting for the Jerring Award; second behind the Olympic gold medalist in skating, Tomas Gustafson.

International honors

References 

Paralympic medalists in swimming
Paralympic gold medalists for Sweden
Paralympic silver medalists for Sweden
Medalists at the 1984 Summer Paralympics
Medalists at the 1988 Summer Paralympics
Swimmers at the 1984 Summer Paralympics
Swimmers at the 1988 Summer Paralympics
Paralympic swimmers of Sweden
1970 births
Living people
Swedish female butterfly swimmers
Swedish female freestyle swimmers
Swedish female breaststroke swimmers
Swimmers from Gothenburg